The Van 't Hoff equation relates the change in the equilibrium constant, of a chemical reaction to the change in temperature, T, given the standard enthalpy change, for the process. It was proposed by Dutch chemist Jacobus Henricus van 't Hoff in 1884 in his book Études de Dynamique chimique (Studies in Dynamic Chemistry). 

The Van 't Hoff equation has been widely utilized to explore the changes in state functions in a thermodynamic system. The Van 't Hoff plot, which is derived from this equation, is especially effective in estimating the change in enthalpy and entropy of a chemical reaction.

Equation

Summary and Uses 
The standard pressure, is used to define the reference state for the Van 't Hoff equation, which is 

This equation is exact at any one temperature and all pressures, derived from the requirement that the Gibbs free energy of reaction be stationary in a state of chemical equilibrium. 

In practice, the equation is often integrated between two temperatures under the assumption that the standard reaction enthalpy  is constant (and furthermore, this is also often assumed to be equal to its value at standard temperature). Since in reality  and the standard reaction entropy  do vary with temperature for most processes, the integrated equation is only approximate. Approximations are also made in practice to the activity coefficients within the equilibrium constant.

A major use of the integrated equation is to estimate a new equilibrium constant at a new absolute temperature assuming a constant standard enthalpy change over the temperature range. To obtain the integrated equation, it is convenient to first rewrite the Van 't Hoff equation as

Development from thermodynamics
Combining the well-known formula for the Gibbs free energy of reaction

where  is the entropy of the system, with the Gibbs free energy isotherm equation:

we obtain

These assumptions are expected to break down somewhat for large temperature variations.

Therefore, when the range in temperature is small enough that the standard reaction enthalpy and reaction entropy are essentially constant, a plot of the natural logarithm of the equilibrium constant versus the reciprocal temperature gives a straight line.

Van 't Hoff isotherm
The Van 't Hoff isotherm can be used to determine the temperature dependence of the Gibbs free energy of reaction for non-standard state reactions at a constant temperature:

Since , the temperature dependence of both terms can be described by Van t'Hoff equations as a function of T. This finds applications in the field of electrochemistry. particularly in the study of the temperature dependence of voltaic cells.

The isotherm can also be used at fixed temperature to describe the Law of Mass Action. Otherwise, the Van 't Hoff isotherm predicts the direction that the system must shift in order to achieve equilibrium; when , the reaction moves in the forward direction, whereas when , the reaction moves in the backwards direction. See Chemical equilibrium.

Van 't Hoff plot
For a reversible reaction, the equilibrium constant can be measured at a variety of temperatures. The data should have a linear relationship, the equation for which can be found by fitting the data using the linear form of the Van 't Hoff equation

This graph is called the "Van 't Hoff plot" and is widely used to estimate the enthalpy and entropy of a chemical reaction.

By measuring the equilibrium constant, at different temperatures, the Van 't Hoff plot can be used to assess a reaction when temperature changes. Knowing the slope and intercept from the Van 't Hoff plot, the enthalpy and entropy of a reaction can be easily obtained using

The Van 't Hoff plot can be used to quickly determine the enthalpy of a chemical reaction both qualitatively and quantitatively. This change in enthalpy can be positive or negative, leading to two major forms of the Van 't Hoff plot.

Endothermic reactions

For an endothermic reaction, heat is absorbed, making the net enthalpy change positive. Thus, according to the definition of the slope:

When the reaction is endothermic,  (and the gas constant ), so

Thus, for an endothermic reaction, the Van 't Hoff plot should always have a negative slope.

Exothermic reactions

For an exothermic reaction, heat is released, making the net enthalpy change negative. Thus, according to the definition of the slope:

For an exothermic reaction , so

Thus, for an exothermic reaction, the Van 't Hoff plot should always have a positive slope.

Error propagation 

At first glance, using the fact that  it would appear that two measurements of  would suffice to be able to obtain an accurate value of :
 
However, the precision of  values obtained in this way is highly dependent on the precision of the measured equilibrium constant values. 

The expectation is that the error will be reduced by this procedure, although the assumption that the enthalpy and entropy of reaction are constant may or may not prove to be correct. If there is significant temperature dependence in either or both quantities, it should manifest itself in nonlinear behavior in the Van t'Hoff plot; however, more than three data points would presumably be needed in order to observe this.

Applications of the Van 't Hoff plot

Van 't Hoff analysis

In biological research, the Van 't Hoff plot is also called Van 't Hoff analysis. It is most effective in determining the favored product in a reaction.

Assume two products B and C form in a reaction:
a A + d D → b B,
a A + d D → c C.
In this case,  can be defined as ratio of B to C rather than the equilibrium constant.

When  > 1, B is the favored product, and the data on the Van 't Hoff plot will be in the positive region.

When  < 1, C is the favored product, and the data on the Van 't Hoff plot will be in the negative region.

Using this information, a Van 't Hoff analysis can help determine the most suitable temperature for a favored product.

In 2010, a Van 't Hoff analysis was used to determine whether water preferentially forms a hydrogen bond with the C-terminus or the N-terminus of the amino acid proline. The equilibrium constant for each reaction was found at a variety of temperatures, and a Van 't Hoff plot was created. This analysis showed that enthalpically, the water preferred to hydrogen bond to the C-terminus, but entropically it was more favorable to hydrogen bond with the N-terminus. Specifically, they found that C-terminus hydrogen bonding was favored by 4.2–6.4 kJ/mol. The N-terminus hydrogen bonding was favored by 31–43 J/(K mol).

This data alone could not conclude which site water will preferentially hydrogen-bond to, so additional experiments were used. It was determined that at lower temperatures, the enthalpically favored species, the water hydrogen-bonded to the C-terminus, was preferred. At higher temperatures, the entropically favored species, the water hydrogen-bonded to the N-terminus, was preferred.

Mechanistic studies

A chemical reaction may undergo different reaction mechanisms at different temperatures.

In this case, a Van 't Hoff plot with two or more linear fits may be exploited. Each linear fit has a different slope and intercept, which indicates different changes in enthalpy and entropy for each distinct mechanisms. The Van 't Hoff plot can be used to find the enthalpy and entropy change for each mechanism and the favored mechanism under different temperatures.

In the example figure, the reaction undergoes mechanism 1 at high temperature and mechanism 2 at low temperature.

Temperature dependence

The Van 't Hoff plot is linear based on the tacit assumption that the enthalpy and entropy are constant with temperature changes. However, in some cases the enthalpy and entropy do change dramatically with temperature. A first-order approximation is to assume that the two different reaction products have different heat capacities. Incorporating this assumption yields an additional term  in the expression for the equilibrium constant as a function of temperature. A polynomial fit can then be used to analyze data that exhibits a non-constant standard enthalpy of reaction:

where

Thus, the enthalpy and entropy of a reaction can still be determined at specific temperatures even when a temperature dependence exists.

Surfactant self-assembly 
The Van 't Hoff relation is particularly useful for the determination of the micellization enthalpy  of surfactants from the temperature dependence of the critical micelle concentration (CMC):

However, the relation loses its validity when the aggregation number is also temperature-dependent, and the following relation should be used instead:

This effect is particularly relevant for nonionic ethoxylated surfactants or polyoxypropylene–polyoxyethylene block copolymers (Poloxamers, Pluronics, Synperonics). The extended equation can be exploited for the extraction of aggregation numbers of self-assembled micelles from differential scanning calorimetric thermograms.

See also
 Clausius–Clapeyron relation
 Van 't Hoff factor
 Gibbs–Helmholtz equation
 Solubility equilibrium

References

Equilibrium chemistry
Thermochemistry
Equations
Jacobus Henricus van 't Hoff